The 1986 1. divisjon was the 42nd completed season of top division football in Norway. The season began on 27 April 1986 and ended on 19 October 1986.

22 games were played with 2 points given for wins and 1 for draws. Number eleven and twelve were relegated. The winners of the two groups of the 2. divisjon were promoted, as well as the winner of a series of play-off matches between the two second-placed teams in the two groups of the 2. divisjon and number ten in the 1. divisjon.

Lillestrøm SK won the league, after a slow start but later 11 wins in a row. It was Lillestrøm's fourth title. Viking and Strømmen were relegated to the 2. divisjon. The league had low attendances this year.

Teams and locations
''Note: Table lists in alphabetical order.

League table

Results

Relegation play-offs
The qualification matches were contested between Tromsø (10th in the 1. divisjon), Drøbak/Frogn (2nd in the 2. divisjon - Group A), and Vidar (2nd in the 2. divisjon - Group B). Tromsø won and remained in the 1. divisjon.

Results
Drøbak/Frogn – Vidar 1–2
Tromsø – Drøbak/Frogn 2–0
Vidar – Tromsø 0–1

Season statistics

Top scorers

Attendances

Notes

References
League table
Fixtures
Goalscorers

Eliteserien seasons
Norway
Norway
1